Irina Ivanovna Alfyorova PAR (born 13 March 1951, Novosibirsk, Soviet Union) is a Soviet and Russian actress. She was formerly married to Russian film and stage actor Aleksandr Abdulov, he adopted her daughter, Ksenia (from marriage to a Bulgarian diplomat Boyko Gyurov).

Biography
Irina Ivanovna Alfyorova was born on March 13, 1951, in Novosibirsk to a family of lawyers.

After graduation, she moved to Moscow and entered the Russian Academy of Theatre Arts (GITIS).

In 1970, as a student, she made her cinematic debut in Alekseich. In 1972 she acted in two more films; The Silver Pipe and Teacher of Singing.

In 1972, Irina Alfyorova graduated from GITIS. In the same year, director Vasily Ordynsky invited her to the role of Dasha in the television mini-series Road to Calvary. In 1977, the series was released and was a great success.

In 1976, she entered the troupe of Lenkom Theatre.

In parallel with work in the theater, she continued to act in films: Black Birch (1977), Autumn Bells (1978).

In 1979, Irina Alfyorova starred in the film directed by Georgi Yungvald-Khilkevich D'Artagnan and Three Musketeers in the role of Constance Bonacieux, which brought her great fame. Her role was voiced by Anastasiya Vertinskaya. In the same year she co-starred with Aleksandr Abdulov in the melodrama Do Not Part with Your Beloved

From 1980 to 1983, Irina Alfyorova starred in several films: Courage (1981), For no apparent reason (1982), Presentiment of Love (1982). In 1984, the political detective TASS Is Authorized to Declare... appeared on the screens, in which Alfyorova played Olga Winter.

In the period from 1984 to 1991, Irina Alfyorova starred in more than ten films, including Seven Elements, Bagration, Love Letters with Intent.

In 1992, Irina Alfyorova was awarded the title of Merited Artist of the Russian Federation.

In 1993, she left Lenkom for the Theatre School of Modern Play.

In the theater "School of Modern Play" she played in the performances Everything will be Fine, as You Wanted, The Other Man, A Man Has Come to a Woman, With His Words.

In 2011, she was engaged in the plays Anton Chekhov. The Seagull, Boris Akunin. The Seagull, The Seagull. The Real Operetta, and Star Fever.

From 1996 to 2007, Alfyorova was mainly engaged in a theatrical career, she also starred in several films (Ermak, Alisa Fox, Sonya Gold Pen, Pechorin. Hero of Our Time and others).

In 2007, she was awarded the title of People's Artist of Russia.

In 2008, she became president of the international film festival "In the Family Circle" . The film festival is held within the framework of the nationwide program of the same name, whose goal is "to strengthen the state ideology aimed at reviving the family in Russia". The festival was founded on the initiative of the Church Public Forum "Spiritually Moral Basis of Russia's Demographic Development" (founders Patriarch of Moscow and All Russia and Presidential Envoy to the Central Federal District).

Personal life

Irina Alfyorova was married to Aleksandr Abdulov, whom she divorced in 1993. After that, she married actor Sergei Martynov. In their family there are four children: Alexander (the son of Alfyorova's deceased sister), Ksenia (Alfyorova's daughter) and two children of Martynov from his first marriage (son Sergey and daughter Anastasia).

In 2007, Irina Alfyorova became a grandmother.

She was blacklisted in Ukraine for supporting the Annexation of Crimea by the Russian Federation in 2015.

Selected filmography

References

External links
 
 Official website

1951 births
Living people
Actors from Novosibirsk
Russian Academy of Theatre Arts alumni
Russian film actresses
Russian television actresses
Russian stage actresses
Soviet film actresses
20th-century Russian actresses
21st-century Russian actresses
Honored Artists of the Russian Federation
People's Artists of Russia